Aaron Staton (born August 10, 1980) is an American actor. He played Ken Cosgrove on the AMC series Mad Men (2007–15) and Cole Phelps in the video game L.A. Noire (2011), for which he was nominated for a BAFTA Award for Best Performer.

Life
Staton grew up in Huntington, West Virginia before moving to Jacksonville, Florida at the age of nine. He met actress Connie Fletcher during their high school years while performing in community theater. They played husband and wife of each other's characters in L.A. Noire.

Career
Staton won a Screen Actors Guild Award for Outstanding Performance by an Ensemble in a Drama Series in 2008 and 2009 with the cast of Mad Men. He has made appearances on shows such as 7th Heaven, Law & Order: Special Victims Unit and Without a Trace. He performed extensive facial capture and voice acting for the video game L.A. Noire, in which he plays protagonist Cole Phelps.

Filmography

Film

Television

Video games

Awards and nominations

References

External links

American male film actors
American male television actors
Living people
People from West Virginia
Male actors from West Virginia
21st-century American male actors
American male video game actors
American male voice actors
1980 births